Pat McGee is a singer, songwriter, and guitarist from Annandale, Virginia, and is a founding member and frontman of the Pat McGee Band.

Biography

McGee attended Bishop O'Connell High School in Arlington County, Virginia. He first played with his older sister's hand-me-down clarinet. After a brief stint learning the piano, he started to play the left-handed guitar owned by his brother, Hugh.

Discography

References

Pollstar – HotStar Pat McGee Band, Pollstar, November 13, 2000. Retrieved June 3, 2007.
Millote, Gregg 'Local dude' on the bill, Newport Mercury, June 29, 2005. Retrieved June 9, 2007.
Trunk, Russell Preparing for the Velvet Limo Ride, Exclusive Magazine. Retrieved June 9, 2007.

Living people
1973 births
Musicians from Richmond, Virginia
People from Annandale, Virginia
People from Bristol, Rhode Island
Singer-songwriters from Virginia
Guitarists from Virginia
21st-century American singers
21st-century American guitarists